Fatty's Chance Acquaintance is a 1915 American short comedy film directed by and starring Fatty Arbuckle.

Plot summary

Cast
 Roscoe 'Fatty' Arbuckle as Fatty
 Billie Bennett as Fatty's wife
 Harry McCoy as Pickpocket
 Minta Durfee as Pickpocket's girlfriend
 Frank Hayes as Cop
 Glen Cavender as Man in park
 Ted Edwards as Ice Cream Vendor

See also
 Fatty Arbuckle filmography

References

External links
 
 
 

1915 films
1915 comedy films
1915 short films
Silent American comedy films
American silent short films
American black-and-white films
Films directed by Roscoe Arbuckle
Keystone Studios films
Articles containing video clips
American comedy short films
1910s American films
1910s English-language films